A score bug is a digital on-screen graphic which is displayed at either the top or lower third during a broadcast ofa sporting event in order to display the current score and other statistics.

History 

The concept of a persistent score bug for association football matches was devised by Sky Sports head David Hill, who was dissatisfied over having to wait to see what the score was after tuning into a match in-progress. The score bug was introduced during Sky's coverage of the newly-formed English Premier League in 1992. Hill's boss repeatedly demanded that the graphic be removed, describing it as the "stupidest thing [he] had ever seen". Hill defied the boss's demands and kept the graphic in place. ITV introduced a score bug at the start of the 1993-94 football season, and the BBC introduced a score bug towards the end of 1993.

The concept was introduced to the United States by ABC Sports and ESPN during coverage of the 1994 FIFA World Cup. Their justification for the graphic was to provide a location for cycling sponsor logos, in order to allow matches to air without commercial interruption.

With the acquisition of rights to the National Football League by BSkyB's American sibling Fox (a fellow venture of Rupert Murdoch), Hill became the first president of Fox Sports. Fox's version of the score bug was branded as the "FoxBox", and was part of its inaugural season of NFL coverage in 1994. Variety criticized it as an "annoying see-through clock and score graphic" and that there would still be people "who actually watched the beginning of the game and would rather have their screen clear of graphics".

Hill once received a death threat from an irate viewer, with a specific emphasis on him being a "foreigner", but the score bug soon became a ubiquitous feature of all sports broadcasts in the USA in the years that followed.

Dick Ebersol of NBC Sports opposed the idea of a score bug, because he thought that fans would dislike seeing more graphics on the screen, and would change the channel from blowout games.

See also
 Character generator
 Intertitle

References

Computer graphics
Film and video technology
Sports television technology
Television terminology
Scoring (sport)